Sergio Valent'e Kindle (born September 20, 1987) is a former American football linebacker. He was drafted by the Ravens in the second round of the 2010 NFL Draft. He played college football at Texas, and was the first player ever to be a finalist for both the Butkus and the Ted Hendricks Award.

Early years
Kindle was coached by Bobby Estes at Woodrow Wilson High School in Dallas, Texas. Playing offense and defense, he excelled at running back and linebacker, rushing for 5,627 yards and 86 touchdowns.

Kindle was also the only player in Texas to boast all-state honors on both offense and defense in 2005. He was also named first-team All-American by USA Today as well as a PARADE All-America selection and Parade Player of the Year finalist. After his senior season, Kindle was invited to play in the 2006 U.S. Army All-American Bowl.

Regarded as a five-star recruit by Rivals.com, Kindle was ranked as the No. 1 inside linebacker prospect in the class of 2006. and was considered the best linebacker prospect from the Dallas area since Dallas Carter's Jessie Armstead in 1989.

Kindle also played basketball as Woodrow Wilson High's starting center in addition to running the 400m, 4×400-meter relay and competing in the long jump.

College career
After missing the first two games of the 2006 Longhorn football season with an ankle injury, Kindle appeared in 11 games at strongside linebacker and on special teams. He registered 21 tackles, three tackles for losses and ranked third on the team in special teams tackles with eight.

Over the summer prior to the 2007 season, Kindle and his teammate Henry Melton were arrested in separate incidents on charges of driving while intoxicated.  Both players were suspended from the first three games of the season, were also required to perform community service and missed the first two days of practice in order to visit with a woman whose son was crippled by a drunk driver.

In his junior season, Kindle started 11 of the 13 games he appeared in, playing linebacker, defensive end and on special teams. He posted 53 tackles, 10 sacks, 14 TFL, 15 pressures, two PBU, a forced fumble and two fumble recoveries. His performances helped the Longhorns defense rank first in the Big 12 and 18th nationally in terms of points per game and earned Kindle a 2008 All-American honorable mention by Sports Illustrated, as well as first-team All-Big 12 honors by the league's coaches, Austin American-Statesman, Kansas City Star and San Antonio Express-News and second-team All-Big 12 honors by Associated Press, Dallas Morning News, Fort Worth Star-Telegram and Waco Tribune-Herald.

For the 2009 season, Kindle was moved to the defensive end position, replacing Brian Orakpo who was drafted by the Washington Redskins in the 2009 NFL Draft. He was named to the watch lists for the Nagurski Trophy, Bednarik Award and Hendricks Award. During the regular season, Kindle compiled 47 tackles, 3 sacks, 17 TFLs, and 31 QB Hurries.

In the 2010 BCS National Championship Game versus Alabama, Kindle recorded 6 solo tackles and 2.5 sacks.

Professional career

Pre-draft
In a poll conducted by the Milwaukee Journal-Sentinel among 17 NFL scouts, Kindle was voted first among 3–4 outside linebackers, capturing 11 first-place votes (comparing to four firsts for the second-placed Jerry Hughes).

Baltimore Ravens

2010 season

Although deemed a first-round talent by most analysts, many teams were scared off by Kindle's often-injured knee and his off-the-field incidents. Kindle fell into the second round and was ultimately drafted 43rd overall by the Baltimore Ravens, using one of the three picks the Ravens acquired by trading their first-round pick (25th overall) to the Denver Broncos (who selected Tim Tebow). Kindle said in a press conference shortly after the draft he was targeting the Defensive Rookie of the Year Award in 2010. However, after the Ravens' minicamp, Kindle acknowledged: "When I said that, it was just an exciting moment for me, getting drafted. My head was in the clouds."

On July 25, Kindle fell down two flights of stairs at a home in Austin, Texas. He was sent to the hospital in stable condition but was described as suffering head trauma. It was later determined he fractured his skull in the fall. As a result, Kindle was unable to attend the Ravens' training camp at McDaniel College.

On September 23, 2010, Kindle signed a one-year contract for $320,000, the rookie minimum, and was immediately placed on the Reserve/Non-Football Injury list. Because Kindle did not sign until Week 3 of the 2010 season, Kindle received a prorated salary of $282,000. The contract included no signing bonus (by comparison, New England Patriots tight end Rob Gronkowski, the player drafted just before Kindle, received a signing bonus of $1.76 million).

2011 season
Eighteen months after he was drafted, Kindle was activated for the first time in his career for the Ravens' Week 4 game against the New York Jets. He played primarily on special teams, but saw some time on defense towards the end of the game.

2012 season
On October 20, 2012, the Ravens waived Kindle to make room for outside linebacker Terrell Suggs, who had spent the first six weeks on the Physically Unable to Perform (PUP) list. On October 22, 2012, Kindle was signed to the Ravens practice squad. On January 7, 2013, he was released from the team.

Personal life
Kindle was born in Los Angeles and moved to Texas shortly after he was born. His father played semi-pro football in Dallas, Texas.

On July 28, 2007, at 2:35 am, Kindle was pulled over for failing to stay in a single-marked lane near downtown Austin, Texas. After failing a field sobriety test, Kindle was arrested and charged with a DWI. Kindle was 19 years old at the time. Although he was sentenced to three days in jail, he served no jail time.

On December 26, 2010, Kindle was arrested for drunk driving at 4:09 am in Howard County, Maryland. Testing revealed that he had a blood-alcohol concentration of 0.17 percent, which is more than twice the legal limit in Maryland of 0.08. He was released from custody after posting a bond of $10,000. Following his second arrest, Kindle spent five days at an alcohol abuse in-patient treatment facility. Judge Neil Edward Axel, Howard County's drug and DUI court supervisor, waived both the mandatory $1,000 fine and the mandatory five-day jail sentence.

On September 16, 2011, Kindle was sued in Davidson County (TN) Circuit Court by U.S. Bank for $130,000, over non-payment of loans from the bank's music and entertainment division, which is based in Nashville. It is reported that the bank planned to have Kindle served with a subpoena during the Ravens' trip that weekend to Nashville, to play the Tennessee Titans.

Kindle eventually became an automobile salesman. In November 2014, he worked in Austin, Texas at Covert Buick GMC. As of December 2016, Kindle is selling cars at Nyle Maxwell Chrysler Dodge Jeep of Austin. As of May 2022, he works as a Warehouse Manager for Delivery Solutions of America.

References

External links

Baltimore Ravens bio
Texas Longhorns bio

1987 births
Living people
Players of American football from Dallas
Players of American football from Los Angeles
American football linebackers
Texas Longhorns football players
Baltimore Ravens players